This is a list of listed buildings in Rudersdal Municipality, Denmark.

List

2800 Kongens Lyngby

2840 Holte

2850 Nærum

2942 Skodsborg

2950 Vedbæk

References

External links
 Danish Agency of Culture

 
Rudersdal